Eibon Records is an independent record label from Milan, Italy, founded in 1996.  It is owned by Mauro Berchi and primarily focuses on very fringe underground music, noise/ambient and doom metal (the former especially).  It is also home to Berchi's own dark ambient group, Canaan.  Other acts to have released albums through Eibon Records include Thergothon, This Empty Flow, Nothing, While Heaven Wept, Colloquio, Esoteric, Act Noir, and Beyond Dawn.

Bands having released albums on Eibon Records (A-Z) 

 Act Noir
 Alison Wait
 Amon (Never Known)
 Asianova
 Bad Sector
 Bestia Centauri
 Beyond Dawn
 Blood Box
 The Blue Project
 Canaan
 Caul
 Cazzodio
 Circadian
 Colloquio
 Control
 A Crown of Light
 Cultro
 Devar
 Ending
 En Nihil
 Esoteric
 Fire in the Head
 First Human Ferro
 The Frozen Autumn (Static Movement)
 Gruntsplatter
 Carlo Baja Guarienti
 Hall of Mirrors
 The Human Voice
 IAM.
 Ignis Fatuus
 Kave
 Kkoagulaa
 Konau
 Luasa Raelon
 Maath
 Melanchoholics
 Moljebka Pvlse
 Mondrian Oak
 Mourmansk 150
 Murder Corporation (Mortar)

 Navicon Torture Technologies
 Naxal Protocol
 Nazca
 Neronoia
 Nimh
 No Fesitval of Light
 Nordvargr
 Nothing
 Olhon
 Ordeal
 Orghanon
 Parade of Souls
 Ras Algethi
 Reutoff
 Russian Love
 Selaxon Lutberg
 Kenji Siratori
 SKM-ETR
 Slogun
 Slow
 Sola Translatio
 Striations
 Svartsinn
 Teresa 11
 Thergothon
 This Empty Flow
 True Colour of Blood
 Vanessa Van Basten
 Wanda Wulz
 Weltschmerz
 Where
 While Heaven Wept

See also
 List of record labels

External links
 Eibon Records Official Site
 Official Bandcamp Site
 Canaan Official Site

Italian independent record labels
Record labels established in 1996
Noise music record labels
Ambient music record labels
Doom metal record labels